Openshaw is a ward in the City of Manchester, United Kingdom.

Openshaw may also refer to:
 Manchester Openshaw (UK Parliament constituency)

People with the surname
 Jennifer Openshaw, American radio personality
 Olive F. Openshaw, English illustrator; see Mary Mouse
 Peter Openshaw (judge) (born 1947), English judge
 Peter Openshaw (immunologist) (born 1954), English immunologist
 Reginald Openshaw Lawson (1880–?), English footballer
 Thomas Horrocks Openshaw (1856–1929), English surgeon
 William Openshaw (1851–1915), English rugby union international